Daniel Barrera may refer to:

 Danny Barrera (Daniel Francisco "Danny" Barrera, born 1990),  Colombian-born, American professional soccer player
 Daniel Quesada Barrera (born 1995), Spanish taekwondo competitor
 Daniel Barrera Barrera (El Loco), Colombian drug lord